Byron Scott "Buster" Brannon (October 21, 1908 – April 14, 1979)  was an American football and basketball player and coach.  He served as the head basketball coach at Rice University from 1938 to 1942 and again from 1945 to 1946 and at Texas Christian University (TCU) from 1948 to 1967, compiling a career college basketball record of 289–296.  His teams played in five NCAA tournaments and won six Southwest Conference championships.  Brannon died of a heart attack on April 14, 1979.

Early life
Brannon was born on October 21, 1908 in Pine Bluff, Arkansas.

Head coaching record

References

1908 births
1979 deaths
American football quarterbacks
Basketball coaches from Arkansas
Basketball coaches from Texas
Basketball players from Texas
Florida Gators football coaches
Guards (basketball)
Rice Owls men's basketball coaches
People from Henderson County, Texas
Players of American football from Texas
Sportspeople from Pine Bluff, Arkansas
TCU Horned Frogs men's basketball coaches
TCU Horned Frogs men's basketball players
TCU Horned Frogs football coaches
TCU Horned Frogs football players
American men's basketball players